Brett Gillard is an Australian former rugby league footballer who played as a back-row forward in the 1980s and 1990s.

He played in 40 matches for Eastern Suburbs in the years 1989–92, Penrith Panthers 1993& 94, Gold Coast Seagulls later renamed the Gold Coast "Chargers" 1995 & 96 and a season with the South Sydney club in 1997.

Gillard in currently associated with one of Eastern Suburbs junior clubs', the Clovelly Crocodiles, in junior development.

References

1970 births
Living people
Australian rugby league players
Penrith Panthers players
Gold Coast Chargers players
Sydney Roosters players
South Sydney Rabbitohs players
Place of birth missing (living people)
Rugby league locks
Rugby league second-rows